Mohamed Irufaan (born 24 July 1994) is a Maldivian professional footballer who plays as a midfielder for Maziya.

Career
Irufaan joined Valencia in 2012 and played at youth level before breaking through into the first team, in the year 2013. He later joined Maziya in the following year 2014 and has won all major trophies at Maldives top fight within just three years of time.

He has also represented Maziya at the AFC Cup. In 2014, Irufaan won the Haveeru Sports Awards for the best under 21 player in the Maldives.

International
Irufaan represented and also captained Maldives at the under 23 level between the years 2012 to 2016.

He made his senior team debut for Maldives against Bhutan in the 2018 FIFA World Cup qualification match. He came in as a 74th minute substitute for Ashad Ali where they went on to win by 4–3.

Honours

Maldives
SAFF Championship: 2018

References

External links
 
 
 

1994 births
Living people
Maldivian footballers
Association football midfielders
Maldives international footballers
Maziya S&RC players
Footballers at the 2014 Asian Games
Asian Games competitors for the Maldives